The 1976 Minnesota House of Representatives election was held in the U.S. state of Minnesota on November 2, 1976, to elect members to the House of Representatives of the 70th Minnesota Legislature. A primary election was held on September 14, 1976.

The Minnesota Democratic–Farmer–Labor Party (DFL) won a majority of seats, remaining the majority party, followed by the Independent-Republicans of Minnesota. The new Legislature convened on January 4, 1977.

The Republican Party of Minnesota had changed its name to the Independent-Republican Party of Minnesota November 15, 1975.

Results

See also
 Minnesota Senate election, 1976
 Minnesota gubernatorial election, 1974

References

1976 Minnesota elections
Minnesota House of Representatives elections